Catops is a genus of small carrion beetles in the family Leiodidae. There are about 16 described species in Catops.

Species
 Catops alpinus Gyllenhal, 1827
 Catops alsiosus (Horn, 1885)
 Catops americanus Hatch, 1928
 Catops apterus Peck and Cook, 2002
 Catops basilaris Say, 1823
 Catops davidsoni Salgado, 1999
 Catops egenus (Horn, 1880)
 Catops geomysi Peck & Skelley, 2001
 Catops gratiosus (Blanchard, 1915)
 Catops kirbii (Spence, 1813)
 Catops luridipennis Mannerheim, 1853
 Catops luteipes Thomson, 1884
 Catops mathersi Hatch, 1957
 Catops neomeridionalis Peck and Cook, 2004
 Catops newtoni Peck, 1977
 Catops paramericanus Peck & Cook, 2002
 Catops simplex Say, 1825

References

 Majka C, Langor D (2008). "The Leiodidae (Coleoptera) of Atlantic Canada: new records, faunal composition, and zoogeography". ZooKeys 2: 357–402.
 Peck, Stewart B. / Arnett, Ross H. Jr. and Michael C. Thomas, eds. (2001). "Family 19. Leiodidae Fleming, 1821". American Beetles, vol. 1: Archostemata, Myxophaga, Adephaga, Polyphaga: Staphyliniformia, 250–258.
 Peck, Stewart B., and Joyce Cook (2002). "Systematics, distributions, and bionomics of the small carrion beetles (Coleoptera: Leiodidae: Cholevinae: Cholevini) of North America". The Canadian Entomologist, vol. 134, no. 6, 723–787.

Further reading

 Arnett, R. H. Jr., M. C. Thomas, P. E. Skelley and J. H. Frank. (eds.). (21 June 2002). American Beetles, Volume II: Polyphaga: Scarabaeoidea through Curculionoidea. CRC Press LLC, Boca Raton, Florida .
 
 Richard E. White. (1983). Peterson Field Guides: Beetles. Houghton Mifflin Company.

External links

 NCBI Taxonomy Browser, Catops

Leiodidae